Delia Vallejos (1925–2005) was a Peruvian singer, Peruvian Creole musician and member of the group "The Big Six Peruvian song" (Las Seis Grandes de la Canción Peruana)

References

People from Callao
1925 births
2005 deaths
20th-century Peruvian women singers
20th-century Peruvian singers
Place of birth missing